IRIS Gardouneh is a  in the Southern Fleet of the Islamic Republic of Iran Navy.

Construction and commissioning 
Gardouneh was built by French Constructions Mécaniques de Normandie at Cherbourg, as one of the first six contracted on 19 February 1974. Her keel was laid down on 18 October 1976 and on 23 February 1978, she was launched. Gardouneh was commissioned into the fleet on 11 September 1978.

Service history 
During Iran-Iraq War, her home port was Bushehr Naval Base. The operation was repeated again on October 31 by the same naval group. However, in this operation Iranian vessels were engaged with three Iraqi s, that fired Styx missiles at them and drew back with maximum speed. Gardouneh and the two other vessels managed to avoid the missiles but could not retaliate.

References 

Missile boats of the Islamic Republic of Iran Navy
Ships built at Shahid Tamjidi shipyard
Ships of the Islamic Republic of Iran Navy
Ships built in Iran
Missile boats of Iran
1978 ships
Ships built in France
Iran–Iraq War naval ships of Iran